In the theory of stochastic processes, a subdiscipline of probability theory, filtrations are totally ordered collections of subsets that are used to model the information that is available at a given point and therefore play an important role in the formalization of random (stochastic) processes.

Definition 

Then

is called a filtration, if  for all . So filtrations are families of σ-algebras that are ordered non-decreasingly. If  is a filtration, then   is called a filtered probability space.

Example 
Let  be a stochastic process on the probability space . Then 

Here  denotes the  σ-algebra generated by the random variables .

 really is a filtration, since by definition all  are σ-algebras and

Types of filtrations

Right-continuous filtration 
If  is a filtration, then the corresponding right-continuous filtration is defined as

with

The filtration  itself is called right-continuous if .

Complete filtration 
Let  be a probability space and let,

be the set of all sets that are contained within a -null set.

A filtration  is called a complete filtration, if every  contains . This implies  is a complete measure space for every  (The converse is not necessarily true.)

Augmented filtration 
A filtration is called an augmented filtration if it is complete and right continuous. For every filtration  there exists a smallest augmented filtration  refining .

If a filtration is an augmented filtration, it is said to satisfy the usual hypotheses or the usual conditions.

See also 
 Natural filtration
 Filtration (mathematics)
 Filter (mathematics)

References 

Probability theory